

Portugal
Angola – 
 Nicolau Aberu Castelo Branco, Governor (1823–1829)
 José Maria de Sousa Macedo Almeida e Vasconcelos, Governor (1829–1834)

Spanish Empire

Captaincy General of Cuba – Francisco Dionisio Vives, Governor of Cuba (1823–1832)
Captaincy General of Puerto Rico – Miguel de la Torre y Pando, conde de Torrepando, Governor of Puerto Rico (1822–1837)
Spanish East Indies – Mariano Ricafort Palacín y Abarca, Governor-General of the Philippines (1825–1830)

United Kingdom
Malta Colony – Frederick Cavendish Ponsonby, Governor of Malta (1827–1835)
 New South Wales – Lieutenant-General Ralph Darling, Governor of New South Wales (1825–1831)
 Western Australia 
 Captain James Stirling, Lieutenant-Governor of Western Australia (1828–1839)
 note:  Colony of Western Australia established 30 December 1828

Colonial governors
Colonial governors
1829